Chom Thong is a subdistrict in the Mueang Phitsanulok District of Phitsanulok Province, Thailand.

Geography
The topography of Chom Thong is completely flat fertile lowlands.  The subdistrict is bordered to the north by Mathum of Amphoe Phrom Phiram, to the east by Makham Sung, to the south by Phlai Chumphon and to the west by Ban Krang.  Chom Thong lies in the Nan Basin, which is part of the Chao Phraya Watershed.  The Khwae Noi River joins the Nan River in this subdistrict.

History
Chom Thong takes its name from the village of Ban Chom Thong, which was formerly known as Ban Kra'om Thong.  There were three historic chedi excavated in the village of Ban Chom Thong (the portion of which now lies in Mathum in Amphoe Phrom Phiram.)

Administration
The following is a list of the subdistrict's muban, which roughly correspond to the villages:

Economy
The economy of the subdistrict is based on the following:
Agriculture
Raise animals
Paid labor
Commerce

Temples
Wat Chom Thong in Ban Chom Thong
Wat Phlai Chumphon in Ban Chom Thong
วัดเกาะ in muban 4
วัดศาลาสูง in muban 4

Government institutions
There are two public health centers within the subdistrict.

Attractions
Luang Purit Museum

References

Tambon of Phitsanulok province
Populated places in Phitsanulok province